Edward Bouverie may refer to:

Edward Bouverie (senior) (1738–1810), English politician
Edward Bouverie (junior) (1767–1858), English landowner, son of the first
Edward Bouverie (1760–1824), MP for Downton, nephew of the first

See also
Edward Pleydell-Bouverie (1818–1889), British politician
Sir Edward des Bouverie (1688–1736), British landowner and politician